Reza Madadi ((born June 20, 1978) is a retired Iranian-born Swedish mixed martial artist who competed in the lightweight division. A professional mixed martial artist from 2006 to 2019, Madadi is best known for competing in the Ultimate Fighting Championship.

Mixed martial arts career

Early career
Madadi started out as a wrestler at the age of 15, his wrestling career saw some good results, winning the Swedish championship in 2002 and 2003 along with victories in Sweden and other parts of Scandinavia, in both the styles of Greco-Roman and Freestyle. He transitioned from wrestling to MMA in 2006.

Madadi competed in Strike And Submit (SAS), Superior Challenge (SC), Furious Fighting Championship (FFC) and a few other fighting organizations. Madadi holds a submission victory over former UFC fighter Junie Browning in 2010, later that year he took a very impressive decision victory against former WEC- and future Strikeforce and UFC fighter Carlo Prater.

He became the Superior Challenge Lightweight Champion in 2011, after defeating former UFC fighter Rich Clementi via unanimous decision at Superior Challenge 7.

He was expected to challenge for the title in British top promotion Cage Warriors, against the champion Matt Veach on June 16, 2011. However, just a few days before the fight Veach had to withdraw due to an injury and Madadi was scrapped from the card.

Madadi's success on the European circuit, 11-2 (6 submissions, 2 TKO's), led to him being considered as one of the best European lightweight prospects.

Ultimate Fighting Championship
In November, 2011 it was reported that Madadi had signed with the UFC.

He was expected to make his promotional debut against Rafaello Oliveira on January 20, 2012 at UFC on FX 1.  However, Oliveira was forced out of a bout with an injury and replaced by Fabrício Camões  Madadi himself would later withdraw from the bout due to injury as well and was replaced by promotional newcomer Tommy Hayden.

In his eventual debut, Madadi faced fellow promotional newcomer Yoislandy Izquierdo on April 14, 2012 at UFC on Fuel TV 2. After being stunned in the first round, Madadi defeated Izquierdo by submission due to a guillotine choke in the second round.

In his next fight for the UFC, Madadi faced Cristiano Marcello on October 13, 2012 at UFC 153.  He lost via a controversial split decision. The decision was controversial since most major MMA media outlets scored the bout for Madadi.

Madadi faced Michael Johnson on April 6, 2013 at UFC on Fuel TV 9.  After a back-and-forth two rounds, where Johnson stunned and dropped Madadi with a headkick late in the first round, Madadi recovered fast and won the fight via submission due to a d'arce choke in the third round. The win also garnered Madadi his first Submission of the Night bonus award.

Madadi was expected to fight Michael Chiesa on July 27, 2013 at UFC on Fox 8.  However, on May 14, 2013, it was announced Madadi pulled out of the bout citing alleged visa issues and was replaced by Jorge Masvidal.

Following Madadi's conviction on burglary charges, the UFC officially released Madadi from the promotion.

Post-UFC
After leaving the UFC following, and still awaiting his sentencing for his robbery conviction, Madadi expressed an interest to go back and fight in the Sweden-based organisation Superior Challenge, in which he held the lightweight title before he got the call from UFC.
On November 23, 2013 at Superior Challenge 9, Madadi entered the cage and called out fellow former UFC-fighter Anton Kuivanen, who fought earlier that evening, defeating one of Madadi's training partners.

He was set to return to the cage on May 3, 2014 at Superior Challenge 10, his opponent was yet to be announced. Later news came that his opponent would be Efrain Escudero and that the fight would be Madadi's first defense of his Superior Challenge Lightweight title, which he won back in 2011. However, Madadi later had to withdraw due to an injury and was replaced by Juha-Pekka Vainikainen.

UFC return
On June 10, 2015 it was announced by Madadi and his management that he was back in the UFC.

Madadi faced Norman Parke on October 24, 2015 at UFC Fight Night 76. He lost the fight by unanimous decision.

He fought Yan Cabral on May 8, 2016 at UFC Fight Night 87. Madadi won the fight by TKO after connecting with an uppercut and follow up punches in round 3.

Madadi was expected to face Rustam Khabilov on September 3, 2016 at UFC Fight Night 93. However on July 25, Madadi pulled out due to undisclosed reasons and was replaced by Leandro Silva. It was later revealed that Madadi had been forced to withdraw due to a heart-related illness. The illness, called myocarditis, causes an inflammation in the heart muscle which can have various consequences depending on the state of the illness and the person who suffers from it. He wasn't in serious danger but would still have to be sidelined from training until doctors hade figured out a solution to his problems.

He was then expected to face promotional newcomer Marc Diakiese on October 8, 2016 at UFC 204. However, Madadi was later forced to withdraw from the contest, after suffering an eye injury that need an emergency surgery. He was replaced by Lukasz Sajewski.

Madadi faced Joseph Duffy on March 18, 2017 at UFC Fight Night 107. He lost the fight by unanimous decision.

Shortly after his fight against Joseph Duffy, Madadi took to his Instagram page to reveal that he had one fight left on his UFC contract and that it possibly would be the last fight of his career. He expressed wishes to get his potential last fight on the upcoming UFC Fight Night 109 in his hometown of Stockholm, Sweden.

Madadi got his wish fulfilled in the last minute, as he stepped in on short notice, replacing an injured Mairbek Taisumov, against Joaquim Silva on May 28, 2017 at UFC Fight Night 109. He lost fight by split decision. Subsequent to this fight, Madadi opted to not renew his contract with the UFC.

Absolute Championship Berkut and retirement
Despite contemplating retirement from MMA, Madadi signed a multi-fight contract with Absolute Championship Berkut. On July 4, 2017 it was announced that Madadi was set to face Yusup Raisov, who vacated his ACB featherweight title and moved up to lightweight division. The fight was planned to take place in the main event at ACB 92 in Malmö, Sweden on August 25, 2018. However, on July 30, 2018 it was announced that the event would be cancelled due to ACB having financial problems.

In May 2019, Madadi announced his retirement from competition, stating that he will be concentrating on coaching mixed martial arts.

Madadi is still training and coaching at his long time gym Allstar Training Center in Stockholm, along with UFC fighters such as Alexander Gustafsson, Ilir Latifi, Jimi Manuwa, David Teymur and Khamzat Chimaev.

Personal life
Madadi is married. He and his wife, Kate, have two sons. Their first child was born in 2013 and the second in 2015.

In August 2012, Madadi saved a baby and father from drowning in a lake outside of his hometown of Stockholm, Sweden.

Madadi acts in one of the roles in the Swedish movie Tommy (2014).

Aggravated burglary and prison sentence
On May 27, 2013, Madadi was arrested in his adopted country of Sweden for burglary. Swedish tabloid Expressen reported that the fighter and an accomplice broke into a designer handbag store before making off with $150,000 (U.S.) worth of stolen goods. Madadi and the accomplice were apprehended and faced charges of aggravated theft and abetting larceny, according to Swedish authorities.
On August 16, 2013 Madadi was found guilty for aggravated burglary and sentenced to 18 months in prison. An appeal from Madadi was filed on September 5, 2013, and he was released from custody awaiting notice from the Swedish court of law. In the second trial, he was again found guilty, and no attempt for a second appeal was made. In March, 2015 after serving the active time of 14 months, the sentence was completed and Madadi was released from prison.

Championships and accomplishments

Mixed Martial Arts
Ultimate Fighting Championship
Submission of the Night (One time) vs. Michael Johnson
Oldest fighter to win a UFC Lightweight fight (37 years, 11 months)
Superior Challenge
Superior Challenge Lightweight Championship (One time; First)
X-Fight FC
X-Fight FC Welterweight Championship (One time; First)
Nordic MMA Awards - MMAviking.com
2016 Comeback Fighter of the Year

Submission Wrestling
Swedish Submission Wrestling Federation
2010 Swedish National Championship  (-79 kg / 174 lbs)
2010 Eskilstuna Submission Wrestling Tournament Winner (-75 kg / 165 lbs)

Amateur wrestling
Swedish Wrestling Federation
2002 Swedish National Championship, Freestyle  (-69 kg)
2003 Swedish National Championship, Freestyle  (-69 kg)

Mixed martial arts record

|-
|Loss
|align=center|14–6
|Joaquim Silva
|Decision (split)
|UFC Fight Night: Gustafsson vs. Teixeira
|
|align=center|3
|align=center|5:00
|Stockholm, Sweden
|
|-
|Loss
|align=center|14–5
|Joe Duffy
|Decision (unanimous)
|UFC Fight Night: Manuwa vs. Anderson
|
|align=center|3
|align=center|5:00
|London, England
| 
|-
|Win
|align=center|14–4
|Yan Cabral
|TKO (punches)
|UFC Fight Night: Overeem vs. Arlovski
|
|align=center|3
|align=center|1:56
|Rotterdam, Netherlands
|
|-
|Loss
|align=center|13–4
|Norman Parke
|Decision (unanimous)
|UFC Fight Night: Holohan vs. Smolka
|
|align=center|3
|align=center|5:00
|Dublin, Ireland
|
|-
|Win
|align=center|13–3
|Michael Johnson
|Submission (D'Arce choke)
|UFC on Fuel TV: Mousasi vs. Latifi
|
|align=center|3
|align=center|1:33
|Stockholm, Sweden
|
|-
|Loss
|align=center|12–3
| Cristiano Marcello
|Decision (split)
|UFC 153
|
|align=center|3
|align=center|5:00
|Rio de Janeiro, Brazil
|
|-
|Win
|align=center|12–2
| Yoislandy Izquierdo
|Submission (guillotine choke)
|UFC on Fuel TV: Gustafsson vs. Silva
|
|align=center|2
|align=center|1:28
|Stockholm, Sweden
|
|-
|Win
|align=center|11–2
| Rich Clementi
|Decision (unanimous)
|Superior Challenge 7
|
|align=center|3
|align=center|5:00
|Stockholm, Sweden
|
|-
|Win
|align=center|10–2
| Carlo Prater
|Decision (unanimous)
|Superior Challenge 6
|
|align=center|3
|align=center|5:00
|Stockholm, Sweden
|
|-
|Win
|align=center| 9–2
| Junie Browning
|Submission (guillotine choke)
|Superior Challenge 5
|
|align=center|2
|align=center|0:22
|Stockholm, Sweden
|
|-
|Win
|align=center| 8–2
| Andy Walker
|TKO (punches)
|Superior Challenge 4
|
|align=center| 1
|align=center| 1:11
|Stockholm, Sweden
|
|-
|Win
|align=center| 7–2
| Raymond Jarman
|Submission (arm-triangle choke)
|Superior Challenge 3
|
|align=center| 1
|align=center| 1:00
|Stockholm, Sweden
|
|-
|Win
|align=center| 6–2
| Oriol Gaset
|Submission (guillotine choke)
|Furious Fighting Championship 2
|
|align=center| 1
|align=center| 2:38
|Casablanca, Morocco
|
|-
|Loss
|align=center| 5–2
| Peter Irving
|Decision (unanimous)
|Strike and Submit 7
|
|align=center| 3
|align=center| 5:00
|Gateshead, England
|
|-
|Win
|align=center| 5–1
| Aidan Marron
|Decision (unanimous)
|Superior Challenge 1
|
|align=center| 3
|align=center| 5:00
|Stockholm, Sweden
|
|-
|Win
|align=center| 4–1
| Peter Wilson
|Submission (armbar)
|X-Fight FC 1
|
|align=center| 1
|align=center| 0:48
|Sunderland, England
|
|-
|Win
|align=center| 3–1
| Romano de los Reyes
|Submission (triangle choke)
|Slamm: Holland vs Thailand 3
|
|align=center| 1
|align=center| 1:04
|Almere, Netherlands
|
|-
|Win
|align=center| 2–1
| Geroid McNichol
|Submission (armbar)
|Strike and Submit 1
|
|align=center| 3
|align=center| 1:28
|Gateshead, England 
|
|-
|Win
|align=center| 1–1
| Christian Johansson
|TKO (punches)
|Travelfight Arena 1
|
|align=center| 2
|align=center| 3:30
|Uppsala, Sweden
|
|-
|Loss
|align=center| 0–1
| Ville Manninen
|Decision (unanimous)
|ZST: Prestige
|
|align=center| 3
|align=center| 5:00
|Turku, Finland
|
|-

Grappling record

References

External links

1978 births
Living people
Swedish male mixed martial artists
Iranian male mixed martial artists
Lightweight mixed martial artists
Mixed martial artists utilizing Greco-Roman wrestling
Mixed martial artists utilizing freestyle wrestling
Mixed martial artists utilizing Brazilian jiu-jitsu
Swedish male sport wrestlers
Swedish practitioners of Brazilian jiu-jitsu
Iranian practitioners of Brazilian jiu-jitsu
Sportspeople from Stockholm
Iranian emigrants to Sweden
Swedish criminals
Ultimate Fighting Championship male fighters